Call blocking, also known as call block, call screening, or call rejection, allows a telephone subscriber to block incoming calls from specific telephone numbers. This feature may require an additional payment to the subscriber's telephone company or a third-party.

Call blocking is desired by individuals who wish to block unwanted phone calls. These generally include types of unsolicited calls from telemarketers and robocalls.

Landlines 

Unwanted calls to landlines may be blocked through a number of methods. Some landline phones have built-in call blocking facilities.  External call blockers are sold as telephone accessories which plug into existing phones. 

Call blockers and related services recently received attention in 2016 from publications including Which? and Consumer Reports in the United Kingdom and United States respectively. Such devices and services enable the user to block a call as it is in progress or alternatively block the number after the call is made. These devices rely on caller ID information and thus a phone blocker requires a caller ID service active on the line for blocking to function. 

Treatment of blocked calls may include:
 Sending the caller to voicemail
 Sending the caller to busy signal
 Sending the caller to "Number No Longer in Service"
 Sending the caller to "Keep Ringing"

Smartphones 
There are a multitude of third-party call blocking applications available for smartphones while some manufacturers provide built-in call blocking functions as standard.

See also 

 Caller ID spoofing

References 

Caller ID
Calling features
Telephone service enhanced features